The Croatian Futsal Cup (HMNK), is an annually held football competition for Croatian futsal clubs and is the second most important competition in Croatian futsal after the Prva HMNL. It is governed by the Croatian Football Federation (HNS) and usually runs from September to December.

Format

Entries 
Although in theory any club can take part in the cup, 32 teams enter the competition proper, based on two criteria:

 Top 27 best-ranked teams according to club coefficient calculated by the Croatian Football Federation which take into account their cup records in the previous five seasons
 Five winners of regional cups

Competition system 
The cup competition consists of two parts:

- the first part is the regional cup in which clubs that did not win a direct placement in the final part

- the second part is the final part in which the performance of 13 best placed clubs by coefficient and 3 winners of regional cups

Regional level matches are played as single-legged fixtures, and pairs are determined by lot. The matches of the final part of the futsal cup are played in the round of 32, round of 16  and Final eight witch include quarterfinals semifinals and finale, with all round being played as single-legged fixtures. Opponents in all rounds are determined by a draw. The winners of the round of 16 plays the Final eight, with a host being a of the qualified teams. The finals formal host is a club with better ranking according to the coefficient of success.

Croatian club cup coefficient 
Clubs are awarded points for participation in specific round of the Cup, except finals where runner up receives 4 points and winner receives 6 points. Points are summed through the season and added to five year ranking. Points are given according to the table:

Points used in this ranking will be used for qualification and seeding for the season 2022–23 as follows:

Winners

References 

National futsal cups
Cup
Recurring sporting events established in 1993
1993 establishments in Croatia